Acanthogyrus is a genus of parasitic worms belonging to the family Quadrigyridae.

The species of this genus are found in Africa.

Species:

Acanthogyrus acanthogyrus 
Acanthogyrus acanthuri 
Acanthogyrus adriaticus

References

Eoacanthocephala
Acanthocephala genera